Aleksandr Yevgenyevich Lisitsyn (born 17 September 1998) is a Russian trampoline gymnast. In 2019, he won the men's tumbling event at the Trampoline World Championships held in Tokyo, Japan. He also won the gold medal in this event at the 2021 Trampoline Gymnastics World Championships held in Baku, Azerbaijan.

He also won the gold medal in the men's team tumbling event at the European Trampoline Championships both in 2018 and in 2021.

References

External links 
 

Living people
1998 births
Place of birth missing (living people)
Russian male trampolinists
Medalists at the Trampoline Gymnastics World Championships
20th-century Russian people
21st-century Russian people